In mathematics, Carathéodory's existence theorem says that an ordinary differential equation has a solution under relatively mild conditions. It is a generalization of Peano's existence theorem. Peano's theorem requires that the right-hand side of the differential equation be continuous, while Carathéodory's theorem shows existence of solutions (in a more general sense) for some discontinuous equations. The theorem is named after Constantin Carathéodory.

Introduction 
Consider the differential equation

with initial condition

where the function ƒ is defined on a rectangular domain of the form

Peano's existence theorem states that if ƒ is continuous, then the differential equation has at least one solution in a neighbourhood of the initial condition.

However, it is also possible to consider differential equations with a discontinuous right-hand side, like the equation

where H denotes the Heaviside function defined by

It makes sense to consider the ramp function

as a solution of the differential equation. This suggests that the idea of a solution be extended to allow for solutions that are not everywhere differentiable, thus motivating the following definition.

A function y is called a solution in the extended sense of the differential equation  with initial condition  if y is absolutely continuous, y satisfies the differential equation almost everywhere and y satisfies the initial condition. The absolute continuity of y implies that its derivative exists almost everywhere.

Statement of the theorem 
Consider the differential equation

with  defined on the rectangular domain . If the function  satisfies the following three conditions:
 there is a Lebesgue-integrable function  such that  for all ,
then the differential equation has a solution in the extended sense in a neighborhood of the initial condition.

A mapping  is said to satisfy the Carathéodory conditions on  if it fulfills the condition of the theorem.

Uniqueness of a solution 

for all  Then, there exists a unique solution 
to the initial value problem

Moreover, if the mapping  is defined on the whole space 

Example 
Consider a linear initial value problem of the form

Here, the components of the matrix-valued mapping  and of the inhomogeneity  are assumed to be integrable on every finite interval. Then, the right hand side of the differential equation satisfies the Carathéodory conditions and there exists a unique solution to the initial value problem.

See also

 Picard–Lindelöf theorem
 Cauchy–Kowalevski theorem

Notes

References 
 .
 .
 .

Ordinary differential equations
Theorems in analysis